Alfred Roberts (1892–1970) was a British grocer and the father of Margaret Thatcher.

Alfred Roberts may also refer to:

 Alf Roberts, fictional character from the British soap opera Coronation Street
 Alf Roberts (trade unionist) (1910–1971), British engineering industry trade unionist
 Alfred Roberts (trade unionist) (1897–1963), British cotton industry trade unionist
 Alfred Jabez Roberts (1863–1939), South Australian stockbroker and sportsman
 Alfred "Uganda" Roberts (1943–2020), American percussionist

See also 
 Alfred M. Robertson (1911–1975), American jockey